James Ward may refer to:

Military 
James Ward (Medal of Honor, 1864) (1833–?), American Civil War sailor 
James Ward (Medal of Honor, 1890) (1854–1901), American Indian Wars soldier
James Allen Ward (1919–1941), New Zealand pilot and Victoria Cross recipient
James H. Ward (1806–1861), American Civil War commander
James R. Ward (1921–1941), U.S. Navy sailor who was awarded the Medal of Honor

Politics 
James Ward (frontiersman) (1763–1846), member of Kentucky House of Representatives and Senate
 James G. Ward (born 1942), American politician in Florida
 James Hugh Ward (1853–1916), U.S. Representative from Illinois
 James Kewley Ward (1819–1910), Canadian lumber merchant and politician
 Jim Ward (Kansas politician) (born 1957), Democratic member of the Kansas House of Representatives

Sports

Football 
James Ward (football manager) (born 1972), football manager with Albion Rovers
Jimmy Ward (footballer, born 1865) (1865–1941), part-time footballer
Jimmy Ward (footballer, born 1929) (1929–1985), Scottish footballer
Jim Ward (American football coach) (1948–2001), American football coach
Jim Ward (quarterback) (born 1944), American football player
Jamie Ward (born 1986), English footballer
Jimmie Ward (born 1991), American football player

Other sports 
James Ward (cricketer) (born 1974), New Zealand cricketer
Jimmy Ward (ice hockey) (1906–1990), Canadian ice-hockey player
James Ward (tennis) (born 1987), British tennis player
Jim Ward (baseball) (1855–1886), Major League Baseball player, 1876

Entertainment 
 James Ward (artist) (1769–1859), British artist
 James Ward (Irish artist) (1851–1924), Irish artist
 James Ward (writer) (born 1981), English writer, founder of Boring Conference
 James Harvey Ward (born 1978), American actor
 Jim Ward (body piercer) (born 1941), pioneer in body piercing when he opened The Gauntlet in 1975
 Jim Ward (game designer) (born 1951), game designer and creator of the Gamma World role-playing game
 Jim Ward (musician) (born 1976), American rock musician
 Jim Ward (voice actor) (born 1959), American voice actor who co-hosts The Stephanie Miller Show
 Jimmy Ward (banjo player) (1909–1987), Irish traditional banjo player

Other
 James Ward (judge) (born 1935), California judge
 James Ward (psychologist) (1843–1925), psychologist and philosopher
 James Clifton Ward (1843–1880), English geologist
 James J. Ward (1886–1923), Danish-born American aviator
 James Thomas Ward, President of the Wesley Theological Seminary, 1886–1897